The following is a partial list of the "B" codes for Medical Subject Headings (MeSH), as defined by the United States National Library of Medicine (NLM).

This list continues the information at List of MeSH codes (B03). Codes following these are found at List of MeSH codes (B05). For other MeSH codes, see List of MeSH codes.

The source for this content is the set of 2006 MeSH Trees from the NLM.

– viruses

– arboviruses

– archaeal viruses

– fuselloviridae

– guttaviridae

– lipothrixviridae

– myoviridae

– rudiviridae

– siphoviridae

– bacteriophages

– bacillus phages

– caudovirales
  – myoviridae
  – bacteriophage mu
  – bacteriophage p1
  – bacteriophage p2
  – bacteriophage t4
  – podoviridae
  – bacteriophage n4
  – bacteriophage p22
  – bacteriophage t3
  – bacteriophage t7
  – siphoviridae
  – bacteriophage hk022
  – bacteriophage lambda

– coliphages
  – bacteriophage hk022
  – bacteriophage lambda
  – bacteriophage m13
  – bacteriophage mu
  – bacteriophage n4
  – bacteriophage p1
  – bacteriophage p2
  – bacteriophage phi x 174
  – bacteriophage prd1
  – leviviridae
  – allolevivirus
  – levivirus
  – t-phages
  – bacteriophage t3
  – bacteriophage t4
  – bacteriophage t7

– corticoviridae

– cystoviridae
  – bacteriophage phi 6

– inoviridae
  – inovirus
  – bacteriophage ike
  – bacteriophage m13
  – bacteriophage pf1
  – plectrovirus

– leviviridae
  – allolevivirus
  – levivirus

– microviridae
  – microvirus
  – bacteriophage phi x 174

– mycobacteriophages

– prophages

– pseudomonas phages
  – bacteriophage pf1
  – bacteriophage phi 6

– rna phages
  – cystoviridae
  – bacteriophage phi 6
  – leviviridae
  – allolevivirus
  – levivirus

– salmonella phages
  – bacteriophage p22

– staphylococcus phages

– streptococcus phages

– tectiviridae
  – bacteriophage prd1

– defective viruses

– hepatitis delta virus

– sarcoma viruses, murine
  – harvey murine sarcoma virus
  – kirsten murine sarcoma virus
  – moloney murine sarcoma virus

– satellite viruses
  – tobacco mosaic satellite virus
  – tobacco necrosis satellite virus

– sspe virus

– dna viruses

– adenoviridae
  – atadenovirus
  – aviadenovirus
  – fowl adenovirus a
  – mastadenovirus
  – adenoviruses, canine
  – adenoviruses, human
  – adenoviruses, porcine
  – adenoviruses, simian
  – siadenovirus

– anellovirus
  – torque teno virus

– ascoviridae

– asfarviridae
  – african swine fever virus

– baculoviridae
  – granulovirus
  – nucleopolyhedrovirus

– badnavirus

– caudovirales
  – myoviridae
  – bacteriophage mu
  – bacteriophage p1
  – bacteriophage p2
  – bacteriophage t4
  – podoviridae
  – bacteriophage n4
  – bacteriophage p22
  – bacteriophage t3
  – bacteriophage t7
  – siphoviridae
  – bacteriophage hk022
  – bacteriophage lambda

– caulimovirus

– circoviridae
  – circovirus
  – gyrovirus
  – chicken anemia virus

– fuselloviridae

– geminiviridae
  – maize streak virus

– guttaviridae

– hepadnaviridae
  – avihepadnavirus
  – hepatitis b virus, duck
  – orthohepadnavirus
  – hepatitis b virus
  – hepatitis b virus, woodchuck

– herpesviridae
  – alphaherpesvirinae
  – infectious laryngotracheitis-like viruses
  – herpesvirus 1, gallid
  – marek's disease-like viruses
  – herpesvirus 2, gallid
  – herpesvirus 3, gallid
  – herpesvirus 1, meleagrid
  – simplexvirus
  – herpesvirus 2, bovine
  – herpesvirus 1, cercopithecine
  – herpesvirus 1, human
  – herpesvirus 2, human
  – varicellovirus
  – herpesvirus 1, bovine
  – herpesvirus 5, bovine
  – herpesvirus 1, canid
  – herpesvirus 1, equid
  – herpesvirus 3, equid
  – herpesvirus 4, equid
  – herpesvirus 3, human
  – herpesvirus 1, suid
  – betaherpesvirinae
  – cytomegalovirus
  – muromegalovirus
  – roseolovirus
  – herpesvirus 6, human
  – herpesvirus 7, human
  – gammaherpesvirinae
  – lymphocryptovirus
  – herpesvirus 4, human
  – rhadinovirus
  – herpesvirus 4, bovine
  – herpesvirus 8, human
  – herpesvirus 2, saimiriine
  – herpesvirus 1, ranid

– inoviridae
  – inovirus
  – bacteriophage ike
  – bacteriophage m13
  – bacteriophage pf1
  – plectrovirus

– iridoviridae
  – iridovirus
  – ranavirus

– lipothrixviridae

– microviridae
  – microvirus
  – bacteriophage phi x 174

– nanovirus

– nimaviridae
  – white spot syndrome virus 1

– papillomaviridae
  – papillomavirus
  – papillomavirus, bovine
  – papillomavirus, cottontail rabbit
  – papillomavirus, human
  – human papillomavirus 6
  – human papillomavirus 11
  – human papillomavirus 16
  – human papillomavirus 18

– parvoviridae
  – densovirinae
  – densovirus
  – parvovirinae
  – dependovirus
  – erythrovirus
  – parvovirus b19, human
  – parvovirus
  – aleutian mink disease virus
  – feline panleukopenia virus
  – mice minute virus
  – parvovirus, canine
  – parvovirus, feline
  – parvovirus, porcine

– phycodnaviridae

– polydnaviridae

– polyomaviridae
  – polyomavirus
  – bk virus
  – jc virus
  – simian virus 40

– poxviridae
  – chordopoxvirinae
  – avipoxvirus
  – canarypox virus
  – fowlpox virus
  – capripoxvirus
  – lumpy skin disease virus
  – leporipoxvirus
  – fibroma virus, rabbit
  – myxoma virus
  – molluscipoxvirus
  – molluscum contagiosum virus
  – orthopoxvirus
  – cowpox virus
  – ectromelia virus
  – monkeypox virus
  – vaccinia virus
  – variola virus
  – parapoxvirus
  – orf virus
  – pseudocowpox virus
  – suipoxvirus
  – yatapoxvirus
  – yaba monkey tumor virus
  – entomopoxvirinae

– rudiviridae

– tectiviridae

– helper viruses

– hepatitis viruses

– adenoviruses, canine

– gb virus b

– GB virus C

– hepadnaviridae
  – avihepadnavirus
  – hepatitis b virus, duck
  – orthohepadnavirus
  – hepatitis b virus
  – hepatitis b virus, woodchuck

– hepacivirus

– hepatitis delta virus

– hepatitis e virus

– hepatitis virus, duck

– hepatovirus
  – hepatitis a virus
  – hepatitis a virus, human

– murine hepatitis virus

– insect viruses

– ascoviridae

– baculoviridae
  – granulovirus
  – nucleopolyhedrovirus

– densovirinae
  – densovirus

– entomopoxvirinae

– iridovirus

– nodaviridae

– polydnaviridae

– oncolytic viruses

– plant viruses

– badnavirus

– bromoviridae
  – alfamovirus
  – alfalfa mosaic virus
  – bromovirus
  – cucumovirus
  – ilarvirus
  – oleavirus

– carlavirus

– closteroviridae
  – closterovirus
  – crinivirus

– comoviridae
  – comovirus
  – fabavirus
  – nepovirus

– geminiviridae
  – maize streak virus

– luteovirus

– mosaic viruses
  – alfamovirus
  – alfalfa mosaic virus
  – bromovirus
  – caulimovirus
  – comovirus
  – cucumovirus
  – potyvirus
  – plum pox virus
  – tobamovirus
  – tobacco mosaic virus
  – tymovirus

– nanovirus

– phycodnaviridae

– potexvirus

– potyviridae
  – potyvirus
  – plum pox virus

– sequiviridae
  – sequivirus
  – waikavirus

– tenuivirus

– tombusviridae
  – carmovirus
  – tombusvirus

– tospovirus

– tymoviridae
  – tymovirus

– proviruses

– reassortant viruses

– rna viruses

– arenaviridae
  – arenavirus
  – arenaviruses, old world
  – lassa virus
  – lymphocytic choriomeningitis virus
  – arenaviruses, new world
  – junin virus
  – pichinde virus

– astroviridae
  – astrovirus

– birnaviridae
  – aquabirnavirus
  – infectious pancreatic necrosis virus
  – avibirnavirus
  – infectious bursal disease virus
  – entomobirnavirus

– bromoviridae
  – alfamovirus
  – alfalfa mosaic virus
  – bromovirus
  – cucumovirus
  – ilarvirus
  – oleavirus

– bunyaviridae
  – hantavirus
  – hantaan virus
  – puumala virus
  – seoul virus
  – sin nombre virus
  – nairovirus
  – hemorrhagic fever virus, crimean-congo
  – nairobi sheep disease virus
  – orthobunyavirus
  – bunyamwera virus
  – encephalitis virus, california
  – la crosse virus
  – simbu virus
  – phlebovirus
  – rift valley fever virus
  – sandfly fever naples virus
  – uukuniemi virus
  – tospovirus

– caliciviridae
  – lagovirus
  – hemorrhagic disease virus, rabbit
  – norovirus
  – norwalk virus
  – sapovirus
  – vesivirus
  – calicivirus, feline
  – vesicular exanthema of swine virus

– carlavirus

– closteroviridae
  – closterovirus
  – crinivirus

– comoviridae
  – comovirus
  – fabavirus
  – nepovirus

– cystoviridae
  – bacteriophage phi 6

– flaviviridae
  – flavivirus
  – dengue virus
  – encephalitis viruses, japanese
  – encephalitis virus, japanese
  – encephalitis virus, murray valley
  – encephalitis virus, st. louis
  – west nile virus
  – encephalitis viruses, tick-borne
  – yellow fever virus
  – gb virus a
  – gb virus b
  – GB virus C
  – hepacivirus
  – pestivirus
  – border disease virus
  – diarrhea viruses, bovine viral
  – diarrhea virus 1, bovine viral
  – diarrhea virus 2, bovine viral
  – classical swine fever virus

– hepatitis e virus

– leviviridae
  – allolevivirus
  – levivirus

– luteovirus

– mononegavirales
  – bornaviridae
  – borna disease virus
  – filoviridae
  – ebola-like viruses
  – marburg-like viruses
  – paramyxoviridae
  – paramyxovirinae
  – avulavirus
  – newcastle disease virus
  – henipavirus
  – hendra virus
  – nipah virus
  – morbillivirus
  – distemper virus, canine
  – distemper virus, phocine
  – measles virus
  – sspe virus
  – peste-des-petits-ruminants virus
  – rinderpest virus
  – respirovirus
  – parainfluenza virus 3, bovine
  – parainfluenza virus 1, human
  – parainfluenza virus 3, human
  – sendai virus
  – rubulavirus
  – mumps virus
  – parainfluenza virus 2, human
  – parainfluenza virus 4, human
  – simian virus 5
  – pneumovirinae
  – metapneumovirus
  – pneumovirus
  – murine pneumonia virus
  – respiratory syncytial viruses
  – respiratory syncytial virus, bovine
  – respiratory syncytial virus, human
  – rhabdoviridae
  – ephemerovirus
  – ephemeral fever virus, bovine
  – lyssavirus
  – rabies virus
  – novirhabdovirus
  – infectious hematopoietic necrosis virus
  – vesiculovirus
  – vesicular stomatitis-indiana virus

– mosaic viruses
  – alfamovirus
  – alfalfa mosaic virus
  – bromovirus
  – comovirus
  – cucumovirus
  – potyvirus
  – plum pox virus
  – tobamovirus
  – tobacco mosaic virus
  – tymovirus

– nidovirales
  – arteriviridae
  – arterivirus
  – arteritis virus, equine
  – lactate dehydrogenase-elevating virus
  – porcine respiratory and reproductive syndrome virus
  – coronaviridae
  – coronavirus
  – coronavirus, bovine
  – coronavirus, canine
  – coronavirus, feline
  – coronavirus 229e, human
  – coronavirus oc43, human
  – coronavirus, rat
  – coronavirus, turkey
  – infectious bronchitis virus
  – murine hepatitis virus
  – sars virus
  – transmissible gastroenteritis virus
  – porcine respiratory coronavirus
  – torovirus
  – roniviridae

– nodaviridae

– orthomyxoviridae
  – influenzavirus a
  – influenza a virus
  – influenza a virus, h1n1 subtype
  – influenza a virus, h2n2 subtype
  – influenza a virus, h3n2 subtype
  – influenza a virus, h3n8 subtype
  – influenza a virus, h5n1 subtype
  – influenza a virus, h5n2 subtype
  – influenza a virus, h7n7 subtype
  – influenza a virus, h9n2 subtype
  – influenzavirus b
  – influenza b virus
  – influenzavirus c
  – isavirus
  – thogotovirus

– picobirnavirus

– picornaviridae
  – aphthovirus
  – foot-and-mouth disease virus
  – cardiovirus
  – encephalomyocarditis virus
  – Columbia sk virus
  – maus elberfeld virus
  – mengovirus
  – theilovirus
  – enterovirus
  – enterovirus a, human
  – enterovirus b, human
  – echovirus 6, human
  – echovirus 9
  – enterovirus, bovine
  – enterovirus c, human
  – enterovirus d, human
  – enteroviruses, porcine
  – polioviruses
  – poliovirus
  – hepatitis virus, duck
  – hepatovirus
  – encephalomyelitis virus, avian
  – hepatitis a virus
  – hepatitis a virus, human
  – parechovirus
  – rhinovirus

– potexvirus

– potyviridae
  – potyvirus
  – plum pox virus

– reoviridae
  – coltivirus
  – colorado tick fever virus
  – orbivirus
  – african horse sickness virus
  – bluetongue virus
  – hemorrhagic disease virus, epizootic
  – palyam virus
  – orthoreovirus
  – orthoreovirus, avian
  – orthoreovirus, mammalian
  – reovirus 3
  – rotavirus

– retroviridae
  – alpharetrovirus
  – erythroblastosis virus, avian
  – leukosis virus, avian
  – myeloblastosis virus, avian
  – sarcoma viruses, avian
  – betaretrovirus
  – mammary tumor virus, mouse
  – mason-pfizer monkey virus
  – ovine pulmonary adenocarcinoma virus
  – deltaretrovirus
  – leukemia virus, bovine
  – primate t-lymphotropic virus 1
  – human t-lymphotropic virus 1
  – simian t-lymphotropic virus 1
  – primate t-lymphotropic virus 2
  – human t-lymphotropic virus 2
  – simian t-lymphotropic virus 2
  – primate t-lymphotropic virus 3
  – endogenous retroviruses
  – epsilonretrovirus
  – gammaretrovirus
  – leukemia virus, feline
  – leukemia virus, gibbon ape
  – leukemia virus, murine
  – abelson murine leukemia virus
  – akr murine leukemia virus
  – friend murine leukemia virus
  – gross virus
  – mink cell focus-inducing viruses
  – moloney murine leukemia virus
  – radiation leukemia virus
  – rauscher virus
  – spleen focus-forming viruses
  – reticuloendotheliosis viruses, avian
  – reticuloendotheliosis virus
  – sarcoma virus, woolly monkey
  – sarcoma viruses, feline
  – sarcoma viruses, murine
  – harvey murine sarcoma virus
  – kirsten murine sarcoma virus
  – moloney murine sarcoma virus
  – lentivirus
  – lentiviruses, bovine
  – immunodeficiency virus, bovine
  – lentiviruses, equine
  – infectious anemia virus, equine
  – lentiviruses, feline
  – immunodeficiency virus, feline
  – lentiviruses, ovine-caprine
  – arthritis-encephalitis virus, caprine
  – visna-maedi virus
  – lentiviruses, primate
  – HIV
  – HIV-1
  – HIV-2
  – simian immunodeficiency virus
  – retroviruses, simian
  – leukemia virus, gibbon ape
  – mason-pfizer monkey virus
  – sarcoma virus, woolly monkey
  – simian immunodeficiency virus
  – simian t-lymphotropic virus 1
  – simian t-lymphotropic virus 2
  – spumavirus

– sequiviridae
  – sequivirus
  – waikavirus

– tenuivirus

– togaviridae
  – alphavirus
  – chikungunya virus
  – encephalitis virus, eastern equine
  – encephalitis virus, venezuelan equine
  – encephalitis virus, western equine
  – ross river virus
  – semliki forest virus
  – sindbis virus
  – rubivirus
  – rubella virus

– tombusviridae
  – carmovirus
  – tombusvirus

– totiviridae
  – giardiavirus
  – leishmaniavirus
  – totivirus

– tymoviridae
  – tymovirus

– vertebrate viruses

– blood-borne pathogens

– dna viruses
  – adenoviridae
  – atadenovirus
  – aviadenovirus
  – fowl adenovirus a
  – mastadenovirus
  – adenoviruses, canine
  – adenoviruses, human
  – adenoviruses, porcine
  – adenoviruses, simian
  – siadenovirus
  – anellovirus
  – torque teno virus
  – asfarviridae
  – african swine fever virus
  – circoviridae
  – circovirus
  – gyrovirus
  – chicken anemia virus
  – dna tumor viruses
  – gammaherpesvirinae
  – lymphocryptovirus
  – herpesvirus 4, human
  – rhadinovirus
  – herpesvirus 4, bovine
  – herpesvirus 8, human
  – herpesvirus 2, saimiriine
  – herpesvirus 1, ranid
  – leporipoxvirus
  – fibroma virus, rabbit
  – myxoma virus
  – polyomaviridae
  – polyomavirus
  – bk virus
  – jc virus
  – simian virus 40
  – papillomaviridae
  – papillomavirus
  – papillomavirus, bovine
  – papillomavirus, cottontail rabbit
  – papillomavirus, human
  – human papillomavirus 6
  – human papillomavirus 11
  – human papillomavirus 16
  – human papillomavirus 18
  – yatapoxvirus
  – yaba monkey tumor virus
  – hepadnaviridae
  – avihepadnavirus
  – hepatitis b virus, duck
  – orthohepadnavirus
  – hepatitis b virus
  – hepatitis b virus, woodchuck
  – herpesviridae
  – alphaherpesvirinae
  – infectious laryngotracheitis-like viruses
  – herpesvirus 1, gallid
  – marek's disease-like viruses
  – herpesvirus 2, gallid
  – herpesvirus 3, gallid
  – herpesvirus 1, meleagrid
  – simplexvirus
  – herpesvirus 2, bovine
  – herpesvirus 1, cercopithecine
  – herpesvirus 1, human
  – herpesvirus 2, human
  – varicellovirus
  – herpesvirus 1, bovine
  – herpesvirus 5, bovine
  – herpesvirus 1, canid
  – herpesvirus 1, equid
  – herpesvirus 3, equid
  – herpesvirus 4, equid
  – herpesvirus 3, human
  – herpesvirus 1, suid
  – betaherpesvirinae
  – cytomegalovirus
  – muromegalovirus
  – roseolovirus
  – herpesvirus 6, human
  – herpesvirus 7, human
  – gammaherpesvirinae
  – lymphocryptovirus
  – herpesvirus 4, human
  – rhadinovirus
  – herpesvirus 4, bovine
  – herpesvirus 8, human
  – herpesvirus 2, saimiriine
  – herpesvirus 1, ranid
  – iridoviridae
  – ranavirus
  – parvoviridae
  – parvovirinae
  – dependovirus
  – erythrovirus
  – parvovirus b19, human
  – parvovirus
  – aleutian mink disease virus
  – feline panleukopenia virus
  – mice minute virus
  – parvovirus, canine
  – parvovirus, feline
  – parvovirus, porcine
  – poxviridae
  – chordopoxvirinae
  – avipoxvirus
  – canarypox virus
  – fowlpox virus
  – capripoxvirus
  – lumpy skin disease virus
  – leporipoxvirus
  – fibroma virus, rabbit
  – myxoma virus
  – molluscipoxvirus
  – molluscum contagiosum virus
  – orthopoxvirus
  – cowpox virus
  – ectromelia virus
  – monkeypox virus
  – vaccinia virus
  – variola virus
  – parapoxvirus
  – orf virus
  – pseudocowpox virus
  – suipoxvirus
  – yatapoxvirus
  – yaba monkey tumor virus

– oncogenic viruses
  – dna tumor viruses
  – gammaherpesvirinae
  – lymphocryptovirus
  – herpesvirus 4, human
  – rhadinovirus
  – herpesvirus 4, bovine
  – herpesvirus 8, human
  – herpesvirus 2, saimiriine
  – herpesvirus 1, ranid
  – leporipoxvirus
  – fibroma virus, rabbit
  – myxoma virus
  – papillomaviridae
  – papillomavirus
  – papillomavirus, bovine
  – papillomavirus, cottontail rabbit
  – papillomavirus, human
  – human papillomavirus 6
  – human papillomavirus 11
  – human papillomavirus 16
  – human papillomavirus 18
  – polyomaviridae
  – polyomavirus
  – bk virus
  – jc virus
  – simian virus 40
  – yatapoxvirus
  – yaba monkey tumor virus
  – retroviridae
  – alpharetrovirus
  – erythroblastosis virus, avian
  – leukosis virus, avian
  – myeloblastosis virus, avian
  – sarcoma viruses, avian
  – betaretrovirus
  – mammary tumor virus, mouse
  – mason-pfizer monkey virus
  – ovine pulmonary adenocarcinoma virus
  – deltaretrovirus
  – leukemia virus, bovine
  – primate t-lymphotropic virus 1
  – human t-lymphotropic virus 1
  – simian t-lymphotropic virus 1
  – primate t-lymphotropic virus 2
  – human t-lymphotropic virus 2
  – simian t-lymphotropic virus 2
  – primate t-lymphotropic virus 3
  – endogenous retroviruses
  – epsilonretrovirus
  – gammaretrovirus
  – leukemia virus, feline
  – leukemia virus, gibbon ape
  – leukemia virus, murine
  – abelson murine leukemia virus
  – akr murine leukemia virus
  – friend murine leukemia virus
  – gross virus
  – mink cell focus-inducing viruses
  – moloney murine leukemia virus
  – radiation leukemia virus
  – rauscher virus
  – spleen focus-forming viruses
  – reticuloendotheliosis viruses, avian
  – reticuloendotheliosis virus
  – sarcoma virus, woolly monkey
  – sarcoma viruses, feline
  – sarcoma viruses, murine
  – harvey murine sarcoma virus
  – kirsten murine sarcoma virus
  – moloney murine sarcoma virus
  – retroviruses, simian
  – leukemia virus, gibbon ape
  – mason-pfizer monkey virus
  – sarcoma virus, woolly monkey
  – simian t-lymphotropic virus 1
  – simian t-lymphotropic virus 2

– papillomaviridae
  – papillomavirus
  – papillomavirus, bovine
  – papillomavirus, cottontail rabbit
  – papillomavirus, human
  – human papillomavirus 6
  – human papillomavirus 11
  – human papillomavirus 16
  – human papillomavirus 18

– polyomaviridae
  – polyomavirus
  – bk virus
  – jc virus
  – simian virus 40

– rna viruses
  – arenaviridae
  – arenavirus
  – arenaviruses, old world
  – lassa virus
  – lymphocytic choriomeningitis virus
  – arenaviruses, new world
  – junin virus
  – pichinde virus
  – astroviridae
  – astrovirus
  – birnaviridae
  – aquabirnavirus
  – infectious pancreatic necrosis virus
  – avibirnavirus
  – infectious bursal disease virus
  – entomobirnavirus
  – bunyaviridae
  – hantavirus
  – hantaan virus
  – puumala virus
  – seoul virus
  – sin nombre virus
  – nairovirus
  – hemorrhagic fever virus, crimean-congo
  – nairobi sheep disease virus
  – orthobunyavirus
  – bunyamwera virus
  – encephalitis virus, california
  – la crosse virus
  – simbu virus
  – phlebovirus
  – rift valley fever virus
  – sandfly fever naples virus
  – uukuniemi virus
  – caliciviridae
  – lagovirus
  – hemorrhagic disease virus, rabbit
  – norovirus
  – norwalk virus
  – sapovirus
  – vesivirus
  – calicivirus, feline
  – vesicular exanthema of swine virus
  – encephalitis viruses
  – encephalitis virus, california
  – la crosse virus
  – encephalitis virus, eastern equine
  – encephalitis virus, venezuelan equine
  – encephalitis virus, western equine
  – encephalitis viruses, japanese
  – encephalitis virus, japanese
  – encephalitis virus, murray valley
  – encephalitis virus, st. louis
  – west nile virus
  – encephalitis viruses, tick-borne
  – flaviviridae
  – flavivirus
  – dengue virus
  – encephalitis viruses, japanese
  – encephalitis virus, japanese
  – encephalitis virus, murray valley
  – encephalitis virus, st. louis
  – west nile virus
  – encephalitis viruses, tick-borne
  – yellow fever virus
  – gb virus a
  – gb virus b
  – GB virus C
  – hepacivirus
  – pestivirus
  – border disease virus
  – diarrhea viruses, bovine viral
  – diarrhea virus 1, bovine viral
  – diarrhea virus 2, bovine viral
  – classical swine fever virus
  – hepatitis delta virus
  – hepatitis e virus
  – mononegavirales
  – bornaviridae
  – borna disease virus
  – filoviridae
  – ebola-like viruses
  – marburg-like viruses
  – paramyxoviridae
  – paramyxovirinae
  – avulavirus
  – newcastle disease virus
  – henipavirus
  – hendra virus
  – nipah virus
  – morbillivirus
  – distemper virus, canine
  – Phocine distemper|distemper virus, phocine
  – measles virus
  – sspe virus
  – peste-des-petits-ruminants virus
  – rinderpest virus
  – respirovirus
  – parainfluenza virus 3, bovine
  – parainfluenza virus 1, human
  – parainfluenza virus 3, human
  – sendai virus
  – rubulavirus
  – mumps virus
  – parainfluenza virus 2, human
  – parainfluenza virus 4, human
  – simian virus 5
  – pneumovirinae
  – pneumovirus
  – respiratory syncytial viruses
  – respiratory syncytial virus, bovine
  – respiratory syncytial virus, human
  – rhabdoviridae
  – ephemerovirus
  – ephemeral fever virus, bovine
  – lyssavirus
  – rabies virus
  – novirhabdovirus
  – infectious hematopoietic necrosis virus
  – vesiculovirus
  – vesicular stomatitis-indiana virus
  – nidovirales
  – arteriviridae
  – arterivirus
  – arteritis virus, equine
  – lactate dehydrogenase-elevating virus
  – porcine respiratory and reproductive syndrome virus
  – coronaviridae
  – coronavirus
  – coronavirus, bovine
  – coronavirus, canine
  – coronavirus, feline
  – coronavirus 229e, human
  – coronavirus oc43, human
  – coronavirus, rat
  – coronavirus, turkey
  – infectious bronchitis virus
  – murine hepatitis virus
  – sars virus
  – transmissible gastroenteritis virus
  – porcine respiratory coronavirus
  – torovirus
  – orthomyxoviridae
  – influenzavirus a
  – influenza a virus
  – influenza a virus, h1n1 subtype
  – influenza a virus, h2n2 subtype
  – influenza a virus, h3n2 subtype
  – influenza a virus, h3n8 subtype
  – influenza a virus, h5n1 subtype
  – influenza a virus, h5n2 subtype
  – influenza a virus, h7n7 subtype
  – influenza a virus, h9n2 subtype
  – influenzavirus b
  – influenza b virus
  – influenzavirus c
  – thogotovirus
  – picobirnavirus
  – picornaviridae
  – aphthovirus
  – foot-and-mouth disease virus
  – cardiovirus
  – encephalomyocarditis virus
  – Columbia sk virus
  – maus elberfeld virus
  – mengovirus
  – theilovirus
  – enterovirus
  – enterovirus a, human
  – enterovirus b, human
  – echovirus 6, human
  – echovirus 9
  – enterovirus, bovine
  – enterovirus c, human
  – enterovirus d, human
  – enteroviruses, porcine
  – polioviruses
  – poliovirus
  – hepatitis virus, duck
  – hepatovirus
  – encephalomyelitis virus, avian
  – hepatitis a virus
  – hepatitis a virus, human
  – parechovirus
  – rhinovirus
  – reoviridae
  – coltivirus
  – colorado tick fever virus
  – orbivirus
  – african horse sickness virus
  – bluetongue virus
  – hemorrhagic disease virus, epizootic
  – palyam virus
  – orthoreovirus
  – orthoreovirus, avian
  – orthoreovirus, mammalian
  – reovirus 3
  – rotavirus
  – retroviridae
  – alpharetrovirus
  – erythroblastosis virus, avian
  – leukosis virus, avian
  – myeloblastosis virus, avian
  – sarcoma viruses, avian
  – betaretrovirus
  – mammary tumor virus, mouse
  – mason-pfizer monkey virus
  – ovine pulmonary adenocarcinoma virus
  – deltaretrovirus
  – leukemia virus, bovine
  – primate t-lymphotropic virus 1
  – human t-lymphotropic virus 1
  – simian t-lymphotropic virus 1
  – primate t-lymphotropic virus 2
  – human t-lymphotropic virus 2
  – simian t-lymphotropic virus 2
  – primate t-lymphotropic virus 3
  – endogenous retroviruses
  – epsilonretrovirus
  – gammaretrovirus
  – leukemia virus, feline
  – leukemia virus, gibbon ape
  – leukemia virus, murine
  – abelson murine leukemia virus
  – akr murine leukemia virus
  – friend murine leukemia virus
  – gross virus
  – mink cell focus-inducing viruses
  – moloney murine leukemia virus
  – radiation leukemia virus
  – rauscher virus
  – spleen focus-forming viruses
  – reticuloendotheliosis viruses, avian
  – reticuloendotheliosis virus
  – sarcoma virus, woolly monkey
  – sarcoma viruses, feline
  – sarcoma viruses, murine
  – harvey murine sarcoma virus
  – kirsten murine sarcoma virus
  – moloney murine sarcoma virus
  – lentivirus
  – lentiviruses, bovine
  – immunodeficiency virus, bovine
  – lentiviruses, equine
  – infectious anemia virus, equine
  – lentiviruses, feline
  – immunodeficiency virus, feline
  – lentiviruses, ovine-caprine
  – arthritis-encephalitis virus, caprine
  – visna-maedi virus
  – lentiviruses, primate
  – HIV
  – HIV-1
  – HIV-2
  – simian immunodeficiency virus
  – retroviruses, simian
  – leukemia virus, gibbon ape
  – mason-pfizer monkey virus
  – sarcoma virus, woolly monkey
  – simian immunodeficiency virus
  – simian t-lymphotropic virus 1
  – simian t-lymphotropic virus 2
  – spumavirus
  – tenuivirus
  – togaviridae
  – alphavirus
  – chikungunya virus
  – encephalitis virus, eastern equine
  – encephalitis virus, venezuelan equine
  – encephalitis virus, western equine
  – ross river virus
  – semliki forest virus
  – sindbis virus
  – rubivirus
  – rubella virus

The list continues at List of MeSH codes (B05).

B04